This is the discography of Scottish punk rock band the Exploited.

Albums

Studio albums

Live albums

Compilation albums

Box sets

EPs

Singles

Videos

Video albums

Music videos

References

Discographies of British artists
Punk rock discographies